In temporal databases, valid time (VT) is the time period during which a database fact is valid in the modeled reality. As of December 2011, ISO/IEC 9075, Database Language SQL:2011 Part 2: SQL/Foundation included clauses in table definitions to define "application-time period tables" (that is, valid-time tables). Valid time was coined by Richard T. Snodgrass and his doctoral student.

In a database table valid time is often represented by two extra table-columns StartVT and EndVT. The time interval is closed at its lower bound and open at its upper bound.

Example:

Valid time is the time for which a fact is true in the real world. In the example above, the Person table gets two extra fields, Valid-From and Valid-To, specifying when a person's address was valid in the real world. On April 4, 1975, John's father proudly registered his son's birth. An official will then insert a new entry to the database stating that John lives in Smallville from April, 3rd. Notice that although the data was inserted on the 4th, the database states that the information is valid since the 3rd. The official does not yet know if or when John will ever move to a better place so in the database the Valid-To is filled with infinity (∞). Resulting in this entry in the database:

December 27, 1994 John reports his new address in Bigtown where he has been living since August 26, 1994. The Bigtown official does not change the address of the current entry of John Doe in the database. He adds a new one:

The original entry Person (John Doe, Smallville, 3-Apr-1975, ∞) is then updated (not removed!). Since it is now known that John stopped living in Smallville on August 26, 1994, the Valid-To entry can be filled in. The database now contains two entries for John Doe

When John dies the database is once more updated. The current entry will be updated stating that John does not live in Bigtown any longer. No new entry is being added because officials never report heaven as a new address. The database now looks like this

See also
Transaction time
Decision time
Slowly changing dimension

References

Database management systems